The 1995 Mobil Cotton Bowl was the 59th Cotton Bowl Classic. The USC Trojans defeated the Texas Tech Red Raiders, 55–14. The Trojans took a 21–0 lead less than ten minutes into the game and led 34–0 at halftime. USC wide receiver Keyshawn Johnson, who finished with eight catches for a Cotton Bowl-record 222 yards and three touchdowns, was named offensive MVP. Trojan cornerback John Herpin had two interceptions, one for a touchdown, and was named defensive MVP.

The game was televised nationally by NBC for the third consecutive year. The Cotton Bowl Classic would return to its longtime television home, CBS, the next year. It was also the last year that Mobil served as the game's title sponsor; the following year, the Cotton Bowl organizers began a seventeen-year relationship with what is now AT&T.

Match-up
USC's appearance was only the third in Cotton Bowl history by a team from the Pacific-10 Conference, following that of Oregon in 1949 and UCLA in 1989.  Texas Tech's appearance was the last by a team from the Southwest Conference, which disbanded a year later. The Red Raiders finished 1-3 against ranked opponents, beating #19 Texas, but losing to #1 Nebraska, #21 Oklahoma, and #10 Texas A&M. They earned a share of the Southwest Conference championship, splitting it with Texas, Baylor, TCU, and Rice. Undefeated Texas A&M had the best record in the conference, but was ineligible for the conference title and could not play in a bowl game due to NCAA sanctions. The Longhorns were slated to play in the Sun Bowl, the Bears were slated to play in the Alamo Bowl, and the Horned Frogs were slated to play in the Independence Bowl, which left the Red Raiders to play in the Cotton Bowl Classic.

Scoring summary
USC - Shawn Walters 11 yard touchdown run (Ford kick), 6:51 remaining
USC - Terry Barnum 19 yard touchdown pass from Rob Johnson (Ford kick), 6:39 remaining
USC - John Herpin 26 yard interception return (Ford kick), 5:35 remaining
USC - Keyshawn Johnson 12 yard touchdown pass from R. Johnson (Ford kick), 2:22 remaining
USC - Ford 39 yard field goal, 6:50 remaining
USC - Ford 42 yard field goal, 0:17 remaining
USC - K. Johnson 22 yard touchdown pass from R. Johnson (Ford kick), 10:29 remaining
USC - K. Johnson 86 yard touchdown pass from R. Johnson (Ford kick), 7:51 remaining
Texas Tech - Zebbie Lethridge 5 yard touchdown run (Davis kick), 2:15 remaining
USC - Jeff Diltz 2 yard touchdown pass from Brad Otton (Ford kick), 2:40 remaining
Texas Tech - Stacy Mitchell 45 yard touchdown pass from Sone Cavazos (Davis kick), 0:00 remaining

Wide receiver Keyshawn Johnson caught 8 passes for 222 yards and 3 touchdowns as USC trounced Texas Tech, who did not score until it was 48-0.

Statistics

References

Cotton Bowl
Cotton Bowl Classic
USC Trojans football bowl games
Texas Tech Red Raiders football bowl games
Bowl Coalition
January 1995 sports events in the United States
1995 in sports in Texas
1990s in Dallas
1995 in Texas